Kupiansk Raion is a district in Ukraine in the state of Kharkiv Oblast. The administrative center of the raion is the city of Kupiansk. Population: 

On 18 July 2020, as part of the administrative reform of Ukraine, the number of raions of Kharkiv Oblast was reduced to seven, and the area of Kupiansk Raion was significantly expanded. Three abolished raions, Dvorichna, Shevchenkove, and Velykyi Burluk Raions, as well as the city of Kupiansk, which was previously incorporated as a city of oblast significance and did not belong to the raion, were merged into Kupiansk Raion. The January 2020 estimate of the raion population was 

It is approximately 120 kilometers to the east of Kharkiv and 40 kilometers south of the border with the Russian Federation.

Subdivisions

Current
After the reform in July 2020, the raion consisted of 8 hromadas:
 Dvorichna settlement hromada with the administration in the urban-type settlement of Dvorichna, transferred from Dvorichna Raion;
 Kindrashivka rural hromada with the administration in the village of Kindrashivka, retained from Kupiansk Raion;
 Kupiansk urban hromada with the administration in the city of Kupiansk, transferred from Kupiansk Municipality; 
 Kurylivka rural hromada with the administration in the village of Kurylivka, retained from Kupiansk Raion;
 Petropavlivka rural hromada with the administration in the village of Petropavlivka, retained from Kupiansk Raion;
 Shevchenkove settlement hromada with the administration in the urban-type settlement of Shevchenkove, transferred from Shevchenkove Raion;
 Velykyi Burluk settlement hromada with the administration in the urban-type settlement of Velykyi Burluk, transferred from Velykyi Burluk Raion; 
 Vilkhuvatka rural hromada with the administration in the village of Vilkhuvatka, transferred from Velykyi Burluk Raion.

Before 2020

Before the 2020 reform, the raion consisted of three hromadas:
 Kindrashivka rural hromada with the administration in  Kindrashivka;
 Kurylivka rural hromada with the administration in  Kurylivka;
 Petropavlivka rural hromada with the administration in Petropavlivka.

History

Kupiansk and the inhabitants of district are served by three hospitals, three medical clinics, three children's clinics and three women's clinics, two sanitary-epidemiology stations. Nine general schools work within the city school system: three high schools, night-school, special general school-boarding-school. Professional schools include a motor transport technical school, medical college, agrarian lyceum, higher professional technical school No. 27, professional school No. 34. Liberal education of Kupiansk includes three musical schools and two sporting schools, station of young technicians and station of young naturalists. For a children under the age of six child's preschools exist.

Four houses of culture, a regional museum, three city libraries, four stadiums, athletic-health complex, pool for swimming, three parks of culture and a rest house for workers lay within the city limits of Kupiansk.

The city lived through a few periods of economic expansion; one of them began at the end of the 19th century. Economic progress led to the development of industry, and also the building of a railway which runs through Kupiansk.

Large changes in the life of city are related to building of the Kupiansk Steel-works factory at the beginning of the 1960s. This was a prosperous time for the regional economy, which also enabled the  region to provide cities with water, heat, and power mediums. In addition this establishment, provided building auxiliary organizations the opportunity development within Kupiansk. This mushroom growth of industry caused an increase in population, that resulted in expansion of social sphere of the city.

Key enterprises, which presently determine the economy of city  are groups of enterprises located within the railway knot which is one of the most extensive in the east region of Ukraine and enterprise of processing of agricultural products also benefit from the location. Currently there are more than 300 enterprises of different types of ownership and over 3000 sole proprietors are registered within the town.

Notable people  
Ilya Ilyich Mechnikov,  microbiologist 
 Vladimir Dudintsev, Ukrainian-born Russian writer

References

External links
Kupensky Youth Network 

Raions of Kharkiv Oblast
1923 establishments in Ukraine